Plavi orkestar is a Bosnian and former Yugoslavian pop rock band from Sarajevo. The band was formed in 1983 by Saša Lošić, who is the lead singer and songwriter of the group. The band has remained popular with seven albums and more than 1500 concerts worldwide.

History
In 1981, sixteen-year-old Saša Lošić, a gymnasium student from Sarajevo, started a band called Ševin Orkestar with Srđan Krošnjar on guitar, Gordan Džamonja on bass, and Admir "Ćera II" Ćeramida on drums. The following year, the four teenagers changed their name to Plavi Orkestar due to another group called Ševe being active in the city at the time. 

Soon after, Lošić switched schools; moving from the Third Sarajevo Gymnasium to First Sarajevo Gymnasium where he met guitarist Mladen "Pava" Pavičić who had already experienced a certain measure of musical prominence having played in a band called Rock Apoteka. Furthermore, Pavičić had appeared at the 1981 Omladinski festival in Subotica with Super 98 (Rock Apoteka's next incarnation), before switching to pop band Mali Princ, and finally ending up in Pauk where he recorded an album, Mumije lažu, released in 1982. Since Pauk was based out of Zavidovići, for teenage Pavičić that meant traveling every weekend for band rehearsals, which his parents weren't too keen on and soon persuaded him to quit the group. He then flirted with and filled in with a variety of bands.

Though Pava and Loša hit it off as soon as they met in school, it wasn't until 1983 that Pava joined Loša's band. The two agreed to do so at a Siluete gig in Sarajevo. As soon as he joined Plavi Orkestar, much more musically experienced Pava arranged for guitarist Krošnjar and bassist Džamonja to be kicked out of the group, seeing them as not committed and dedicated enough. Before summer 1983, Samir "Ćera I" Ćeramida joined on bass as a replacement for Džamonja.

Beginning
This is when the group's activity became decidedly more serious and it's generally considered as the band's real beginning. They started appearing as the opening act for big Yugoslav touring bands like Riblja Čorba and Leb i Sol, which got them exposure in the country's press. However, the reviews and notices were atrocious, which Loša took quite hard and for a time even decided to quit music. Still, the enthusiasm among other band members brought him back and he devoted himself to writing pop ballads, most of which were inspired by unrequited love for a girl he was after at the time. During summer 1983, they held a gig at Sarajevo club called Trasa where they got spotted by Laboratorija Zvuka's Bata Vranešević who noticed their potential, inviting them to Belgrade to record material. In September 1983 as a send-off before going away to serve the army stint, they played another show at Trasa. The next day they were on a train to Belgrade where in Enco Lesić's studio, Druga maca, they recorded three tracks — "Soldatski bal", "Goodbye Teens", and "Suada" — all of which would become future hits. 

After this, all four band members left straight to serve in their mandatory Yugoslav People's Army stint. A year later in September 1984, they returned to Sarajevo where their mates from the scene, Zabranjeno Pušenje, were enjoying breakout success with their debut album. Loša and Pava returned home first, continuing where they left off while waiting for their rhythm section to come back home. However, due to poor gig quality and general malaise, the two got into a row that ended up with Pava quitting the band. Loša then got in touch with music manager Malkolm Muharem, who previously worked with Elvis J. Kurtovich and His Meteors; the two arranged for the band (though the group strictly speaking didn't even exist at the moment) to record a few more demos in Zagreb with the help of Parni Valjak's Husein Hasanefendić and Rastko Milošev. While in Zagreb, Loša managed to get the country's best known record label interested in the group, signing a pre-contract with Jugoton. The event was the catalyst for Pava to return to the band.

Debut album
In early 1985, the band's first album Soldatski bal (Soldier's Ball) was recorded in SIM studio, Zagreb. From this album the band had many hit singles such as "Suada", "Medena curice" (Honey Girl), "Odlazi nam raja" (Our Friends are Leaving), "Bolje biti pijan nego star" (Better to be drunk than old), "Goodbye Teens", and the title track, "Soldatski bal". The album's lyrics were based on Loša's experiences whilst serving in the army. Their second album "Smrt Fašizmu" ("Death to Fascism") was another outstanding success for the band, selling over 300,000 copies in Yugoslavia and being certified diamond. This album spawned several hits: "Fa, fa fašista nemoj biti ti (jerbo ću te ja draga ubiti)", "Puteru Puteru", "Sava Tiho Teče", "Zelene su bile oči te" and "Kad si sam druže moj".

In 1989, they returned with the album "Sunce na prozoru" which was another big hit for the band. It included such hits as "Kaja", "Lovac i košuta" and "Proljeće". Their 1991 release, Simpatija, would be their last album issued in Yugoslavia prior to its breakup. It included their version of Mamas and Papas hit single "California Dreaming" (titled "Ljubi se Istok i Zapad) which is still a big hit to this day in the post-Yugoslav republics. They were on hiatus until 1998 when they released "LongPlay" which included the hits "Ako su to bile samo laži" and "Od rođendana do rođendana". After that came the album "Infinity" released in 1999, which included numerous hit singles like "Odlazim", "Djevojka iz snova" and "Pijem da je zaboravim". "Infinity" was followed by "Sedam" in 2012.

Members
Saša Lošić - Loša: vocals, songwriting, composing
Mladen Pavičić: Lead/Electric Guitar (occasional keyboards)
Saša Zalepugin: Lead/Electric Guitar
 Samir Ćeramida, Ćera I: Bass Guitar
 Admir Ćeremida, Ćera II: Drums

Discography

Studio albums
Soldatski bal (1985) 
Smrt fašizmu (1986) 
Sunce na prozoru (1989) 
Simpatija (1991) 
Everblue 1 and 2 Greatest Hits* (1996) 
Longplay (1998) 
Infinity (1999) 
Sedam (2012)

Compilation albums
The Ultimate Collection - Plavi Orkestar (Croatia Records, 2007)
The Platinum Collection - Plavi Orkestar (City Records, 2007)
Greatest Hits Collection - Plavi Orkestar (Croatia Records, 2016)

See also
Sarajevo school of pop rock
New Primitives

External links
Saša Lošić Official site
Plavi Orkestar Official Site

Bosnia and Herzegovina musical groups
Yugoslav rock music groups
Sibling musical groups